Albert Guerard may refer to:

Albert Léon Guérard (1880–1959), American scholar of comparative literature
Albert J. Guerard (1914–2000),  American critic, novelist and professor, son of the above